Mirpur Royals is a franchise cricket team that represents Mirpur in the Kashmir Premier League. Shoaib Malik is the captain and Abdul Razzaq is the coach of the team. Shoaib Malik was announced as Mirpur Royals’ icon player.

Squad

Season standings

Points table

League fixtures and results

Playoffs

Qualifier

Final

Statistics

Most runs 

Source: Cricinfo

Most wickets 

Source: Cricinfo

References

Kashmir Premier League (Pakistan)